Clun is a civil parish in Shropshire, England.  It contains 160 listed buildings that are recorded in the National Heritage List for England.  Of these, one is listed at Grade I, the highest of the three grades, seven are at Grade II*, the middle grade, and the others are at Grade II, the lowest grade.  The parish contains the small town of Clun, and smaller settlements, including Bicton, Chapel Lawn, New Invention and Whitcott Keysett, and is otherwise entirely rural.

The town has an ancient history, and its oldest surviving listed buildings are the remains of Clun Castle, and the Norman west tower of St George's Church.  A high proportion of the listed buildings are houses, cottages, farmhouses, and farm buildings, many of them timber framed, some with cruck construction, and dating from the 13th to the 18th century.  In the churchyard of St George's Church are many listed memorials, consisting of chest tombs, pedestal tombs, and a headstone.  The River Clun passes through the parish, and the bridge crossing it in the town, which dates back to the 14th or 15th century, is listed.  Other listed buildings include hotels and public houses, a group of almshouses, the lychgate to St George's Church, the former town hall, former watermills, a sequence of milestones, another church, a war memorial, and two telephone kiosks.


Key

Buildings

Notes and references

Notes

Citations

Sources

Lists of buildings and structures in Shropshire
Listed buildings